Parviraptor is a genus of stem-snake (clade Ophidia) containing one species, Parviraptor estesi, from the Late Jurassic (Tithonian) or Early Cretaceous (Berriasian) Purbeck Limestone Formation of Dorset, England. A second species, Parviraptor gilmorei, was described from the Late Jurassic Morrison Formation of Western North America; it was present in stratigraphic zone 4. However, the second species was subsequently transferred to a separate genus Diablophis. An indeterminate species is known from the Bathonian aged Kirtlington Mammal Bed (Kilmaluag Formation, Scotland).

Description 
The shape, length, and body form of Parviraptor and other early snakes is not currently known. Parviraptor is classified as a basal snake based on skull morphology. It shares most skull features with modern snakes, but notably does not have the lateral notches in the lower jaw found in modern snakes. Its vertebrae share all diagnostic features of later snakes. Analysis of Parviraptor fossils supports the hypothesis that snake ancestors evolved snakelike heads earlier than snakelike bodies.

Phylogeny 
Cladogram based in the phylogenetic analysis by Caldwell et al. (2015):

See also

References

Prehistoric snakes
Late Jurassic reptiles of Europe
Morrison fauna
Fossil taxa described in 1994
†